is a town located in Aomori Prefecture, Japan. , the town had an estimated population of 16,625 in 7251 households, and a population density of 51 persons per km² in 7,269 households.

Geography
Tōhoku is located in north-central Aomori Prefecture, bordering on the west shore of Lake Ogawara.

Neighboring municipalities
Aomori Prefecture
Hiranai
Misawa
Noheji
Rokkasho
Rokunohe
Shichinohe
Towada

Climate
The town has a cold maritime climate characterized by cool short summers and long cold winters with heavy snowfall (Köppen climate classification Cfa).  The average annual temperature in Tōhoku is 9.8 °C. The average annual rainfall is 1217 mm with September as the wettest month. The temperatures are highest on average in August, at around 22.5 °C, and lowest in January, at around −2.1 °C.

Demographics
Per Japanese census data, the population of Tōhoku has steadily declined over the past 60 years.

History
During the Edo period, the area around Tōhoku was controlled by the Nambu clan of Morioka Domain, becoming part of the territories of Shichinohe Domain in the latter half of the Edo period. In the post-Meiji Restoration  establishment of the modern municipalities system on 1 April 1889,  was created. It was elevated to town status on November 1, 1963, at which time it was renamed to its present name. The neighboring town of Kamikita merged with Tōhoku on March 31, 2005.

Government
Tōhoku has a mayor-council form of government with a directly elected mayor and a unicameral town council of 12 members. Tōhoku is part of Kamikita District which contributes four members to the Aomori Prefectural Assembly. In terms of national politics, the town is part of Aomori 2nd district of the lower house of the Diet of Japan.

Economy
The economy of Tōhoku is heavily dependent on an agriculture, based primarily on production of nagaimo, daikon and carrots as well as lake fish, including smelt, icefish and shijimi.

Education
Tōhoku has three public elementary schools and two public middle schools operated by the town government. The town does not have a high school.

Transportation

Railway
 Aoimori Railway Company – Aoimori Railway Line
  -  -  -

Highway
 
  Shimokita Expressway
 
  (unsigned)

Noted people from Tōhoku
 Masato Shibata, jockey
 Yoshitomi Shibata, jockey
 Takemi Sasaki, jockey
 Mitsuru Fukikoshi, actor

References

External links

Official Website 

 
Towns in Aomori Prefecture